The 2018 Rugby Football League Championship is a rugby league football competition played primarily in the United Kingdom, one tier below the first tier Super League. The 2018 season is the fourth to consist of the Super 8s structure combining the Championship and Super League three-quarters of the way through the season.

The 2018 Championship features 12 teams, which all play one another twice in the regular season, once at home, and once away, totalling 22 games. The 2018 season also features the "Summer Bash Weekend" for a fourth time. This is a 23rd round of fixtures which replicates Super League's Magic Weekend concept for the Championship sides. After these 23 rounds in both the Championship and the Super League, the two divisions of twelve are split into three divisions of eight, the "Super 8s".

New sponsors for the league were announced in January 2018, and the league will be known as the Betfred Championship until the end of 2019. The bookmakers, Betfred, extended their sponsorship of rugby league to include the Championship and League 1 as well as Super League.

Teams
This year's competition features 12 teams. The teams consist of nine of the 12 teams from 2017, the champions of the 2017 League One season, the Toronto Wolfpack, and the champion of the League One playoffs, Barrow Raiders. Bradford Bulls and Oldham, the two bottom placed teams in the 2017 season, were relegated to League One, while Hull Kingston Rovers were promoted back to Super League after just one season in the Championship.

Regular season results

Final standings

The Qualifiers

Toronto, London, Toulouse and Halifax will play in the 2018 Qualifiers together with Super League sides Leeds, Hull Kingston Rovers, Salford and Widnes.  With points reset to zero, after each side has played each other once the top three teams will qualify for Super League XXIV in 2019.  The teams finishing fourth and fifth will play each other in the Million Pound Game with the winner also qualifying for Super League XXIV.  The losers of the Million Pound Game together with the teams finishing sixth, seventh and eighth in the Qualifiers will play in the 2019 Rugby League Championship.

Championship Shield
The clubs finishing fifth and below in the regular season play for the Championship Shield.  Points earned during the regular season are carried forward and after seven more games the top two clubs play in the shield final.  Prior to the start of the season it was announced that the two clubs at the bottom of the table will be  relegated to the League 1 for 2019, however following an emergency general meeting of the RFL on 13 September 2018 the Championship and League 1 clubs agreed that for 2019 the number of clubs in the Championship would be increased from 12 to 14.  To achieve this the team finishing 11th will not be relegated and the team finishing bottom will play-off against the League 1 team that loses the League 1 promotion final to decide which team will play in the Championship for 2019.

Results

Standings

References

2018 in English rugby league
2018 in French rugby league
Rugby Football League Championship
2018 in Canadian sports